Abadir and Iraja are saints in the Coptic Church and the Roman Catholic Church.

Legend
They are reported to have been children of the sister of Basilides, "the father of kings". According to their legend, Abadir and Iraja fled from Antioch to Alexandria. They were arrested there and brought to Antinoe in Upper Egypt, where they were beheaded along with Cluthus, a physician and priest, and another 3,685 companions. These included the following priests:

Apa Paphnutius of Tentyra
Apa Isaac of Tiphre
Apa Shamul of Taraphia
Apa Simon of Tapcho
Sissinus of Tantatho
Theodore of Shotep
Moses of Psammaniu
Philotheus of Pemdje
Macarius of Fayum
Maximus of Vuchim
Macroni of Thoni
Senuthius of Buasti
Simeon of Thou
Ptolemaeus, son of the Eparch, and
Thomas of Tanphot.

Abadir and Iraja had a church dedicated to them in Asyut in Egypt. Their feast day is on September 25 (Gregorian Calendar) and October 8 (Julian Calendar). 
The text of their Passion exists in both Sahidic and Bohairic Coptic and fragments can be found at the National Library, Vienna, Wiener Papyrussammlung, K2563 a-l, ed.
Orlandi, 1974, the National Library, Paris, Copte 129.16.104 and the Vatican Library, Rome, Copti 63, fols. 1-65, ed. Hyvernat, 1886–1887.

A summary of their lives, commemorated on Tout 28 (October 8), can be found in the Copto-Arabic Synaxarion.

Hagiographer and church historian Frederick George Holweck considers the story "spurious".

References

Groups of Christian martyrs of the Roman era
Saints from Roman Egypt
Saints duos